Samuel Untermyer II, (25 November 1912 – 26 January 2001) was an American nuclear scientist. He was the son of notable New York City jurist Irwin Untermyer and grandson of attorney Samuel Untermyer.

Samuel Untermyer II theorized that steam bubble formation in a nuclear reactor core would not produce unstable reactions, but would instead result in an inherently stable and self-controlling reactor design. This was  eventually proved in the BORAX experiments, which led to the design of the Boiling water reactor. In recognition of his fundamental development work on  water-cooled reactors, the American Nuclear Society now has an award named after him for work in this field.

Untermyer was awarded the Newcomen Medal in 1980.

External links
Samuel Untermyer II Award page at American Nuclear Society
Paid Notice: Deaths Untermyer, Samuel II (The New York Times)
"Boiling Water Reactor Simulator with Passive Safety Systems - IAEA" On page 14 there is a brief summary of Samuel Untermyer's work at Argonne National Laboratory on the BORAX experiments; (PDF, 11 MB).
Chapter on Untermyer and the BORAX experiments in the Idaho National Laboratory's history Proving the Principle.

1912 births
2001 deaths
American nuclear physicists
American people of German-Jewish descent
Jewish American scientists
20th-century American engineers
20th-century American Jews